Moor Row is a village in Cumbria, North West England. It is in Egremont civil parish and lies on a minor road off the A595, south-east of Whitehaven. In 2018 it had an estimated population of 759.

Moor Row is a residential community on Cumbria's coastal plain. The history of Moor Row goes back to at least 1762, but it was the 19th century discovery of iron ore in the vicinity that built the 'row of houses on a moor'. Cornish tin miners moved here to work the mines, and their presence is noted in a number of street names such as Penzance Street. Another street, Dalzell, is named after Thomas Henry Dalzell, a mine owner.

Houses
The village name probably refers to the Scalegill street houses, which are noted on an 1860 Ordnance Survey map. The 1859 homes on Dalzell Street are thought to be the oldest of the terraced rows. The village has grown in the 20th century, adding modern suburban homes to the mixture and is continuing to do so in the 21st century.

Mines
Moor Row's Montreal Mines produced 250,000 tons a year, the largest of any mine in the Whitehaven or Furness district. The mine property covered , half of which was ore bearing. Both open pit and shaft mining took place. Between 1000 and 1200 people were employed locally in the industry.

Railway
Moor Row formerly had a station on the Whitehaven, Cleator and Egremont Junction Railway.  A railway shunting yard was built in the village, bringing further jobs and prosperity to the inhabitants.  It became western Cumbria's most important junction and goods yard until the end of World War II when trucks and the motorways brought about the decline of the railways in the UK.  The railway closed in 1980 with the closing of the last mine at Beckermet.  The railway is still in situ and runs to Mirehouse Junction.  It is also now part of both the national coast to coast walk and cycleway.

Employment
Westlakes Science and Technology Park is a local employer today. Also the nuclear power plant Sellafield is a few miles away which also offers local employment.

Sport
The Village has a football team, Moor Row F.C.

References

External links

Villages in Cumbria
Egremont, Cumbria